Roulland Le Roux (fl. 1508 - 1527) was a French gothic architect responsible for the Flamboyant west facade and the Tour De Beurre of Rouen Cathedral, and the Bureau Des Finances in Rouen. He also contributed to the Palais De Justice of Rouen.

References

Gothic architects
1465 births
1527 deaths
Architects from Rouen
15th-century French architects
16th-century French architects